Events from the 1300s in Denmark.

Incumbents 
 Monarch – Eric VI of Denmark

Events 
1301
 Ebeltoft is incorporated as a market town.
 Slangerup is incorporated as a market town. (later recalled).
1302
 Randers is incorporated as a market town.

1306
 Sakskøbing is incorporated as a market town.

Births 
 c. 1307 – Eric Christoffersen of Denmark
 1308 – Niels Ebbesen, squire (died 1340)

Deaths 
 1303 – Erik Knudsen Skarsholm, duke and drost (born 1254)
 29 September 1304  Agnes of Brandenburg, Queen of Denmark (born c. 1257=
 c. 1309 – Jacob Nielsen, Count of Halland

References 

1300s in Denmark